US Post Office-Christiansburg is a historic post office building located at Christiansburg, Montgomery County, Virginia. It was designed and built in 1936, and was designed by the Office of the Supervising Architect of the Treasury Department under Louis A. Simon.  The one-story, five-bay, brick building is in the Colonial Revival style.  It features a denticulated cornice and a standing-seam metal, gabled roof surmounted by a small, flat-roofed cupola.  The interior features a Works Progress Administration sponsored mural by Paul DeTroot, depicting local events of the French and Indian and Revolutionary wars.

It was listed on the National Register of Historic Places in 1989.  It is located in the Christiansburg Downtown Historic District.

References

Christiansburg
Colonial Revival architecture in Virginia
Government buildings completed in 1936
Buildings and structures in Montgomery County, Virginia
National Register of Historic Places in Montgomery County, Virginia
Individually listed contributing properties to historic districts on the National Register in Virginia